Berkan Durmaz (born February 20, 1997) is a Turkish professional basketball player for Pınar Karşıyaka of the Basketbol Süper Ligi (BSL). Standing at 6 ft 9 in (2.06 m), he plays as power forward.

Professional career
Born in Osmangazi in Bursa, Durmaz cut his teeth in the youth system of Tofaş S.K., before making his debut in professional basketball during the 2015–16 season. He saw action for Tofas in the TBL as well as for the club’s reserve squad in the TBL2.

On July 2, 2021, he has signed with Pınar Karşıyaka of the Turkish Super League (BSL).

International career 
Durmaz represented the Turkish national basketball team at the 2013 under-16 and the 2015 under-18 European Championships.

References

External links 
 TBLStat.net Player Profile
 Eurobasket.com profile
 FIBA Profile

1997 births
Living people
Karşıyaka basketball players
Power forwards (basketball)
Tofaş S.K. players
Turkish men's basketball players
21st-century Turkish people